Peter von Mendelssohn (1908–1982) was a German writer and historian. Of Jewish heritage he was forced to leave Germany following the Nazi Party's rise to power in 1933. He become a prominent member of the exile community, along with figures such as Thomas Mann. In 1936 settled in Britain where he became a naturalised subject. His 1932 novel Schmerzliches Arkadien was adapted into a 1955 film Marianne of My Youth.

After the Second World War he served as a press officer with the Allied Control Council in Düsseldorf. He subsequently returned to live in Munich in 1970, where he died twelve years later. He was married to fellow exile and writer Hilde Spiel.

References

Bibliography 
 Volkmar Zuhlsdorff. Hitler's Exiles: The German Cultural Resistance in America and Europe. A&C Black, 2005.

External links 
 

1908 births
1982 deaths
Writers from Munich
20th-century German novelists
20th-century German historians
Jewish emigrants from Nazi Germany to the United Kingdom
Jewish German writers
British people of German-Jewish descent
20th-century German translators